The minimum weight is a concept used in various branches of mathematics and computer science related to measurement.

Minimum Hamming weight, a concept in coding theory
Minimum weight spanning tree
Minimum-weight triangulation, a topic in computational geometry and computer science